The 2006 Temple Owls football team represented Temple University in the college 2006 NCAA Division I FBS football season. Temple competed as an independent. The team was coached by first-year head coach Al Golden and played their homes game in Lincoln Financial Field.

Schedule

References

Temple
Temple Owls football seasons
Temple Owls football